Daynia La-Force is a women's basketball coach.  She spent 25 years coaching college women’s basketball.  In 2021, She was an assistant coach with the WNBA's Atlanta Dream. She played college basketball at the Georgetown University. In May 2014, she was hired as head coach of Rhode Island Rams women's basketball after head coaching stints at Division II University of New Haven and Division I Northeastern University. She also served as an assistant coach at St. John's and LIU Brooklyn. An African-American, La-Force became the first minority woman head coach in URI history when she was hired in 2014. Her son Terance Mann played collegiately for Florida State and currently plays for the Los Angeles Clippers.

References

External links
Rhode Island Rams bio

Year of birth missing (living people)
Living people
African-American basketball players
African-American basketball coaches
American women's basketball coaches
American women's basketball players
Place of birth missing (living people)
Georgetown Hoyas women's basketball players
LIU Brooklyn Blackbirds women's basketball coaches
New Haven Chargers women's basketball coaches
Northeastern Huskies women's basketball coaches
Rhode Island Rams women's basketball coaches
St. John's Red Storm women's basketball coaches
21st-century African-American people
21st-century African-American women